The Irisbus Midirider is a midibus made by Irisbus.

References

Midibuses